Enchanted Valley is a small snow-filled valley between Walker Peak and Hannah Peak in the southwest end of the Dufek Massif, Pensacola Mountains. The name describes the scenic beauty of the valley and was applied by the United States – International Geophysical Year party from Ellsworth Station that visited the valley in December 1957.

References 

Valleys of Queen Elizabeth Land